The American Film Institute Awards (also known as the AFI Awards) are awards presented by the American Film Institute to recognize the top 10 films and television programs of the year. Unlike other accolades about the art form, the AFI Awards acknowledge the film and television productions deemed culturally and artistically representative of the year's most significant achievements in the art of the moving image in American cinema.

Media that does not fit the AFI's conventional eligibility criteria for the main categories, such as non-American productions as well as other types of media, are given recognition through the AFI Special Award.

2000
The 2000 AFI Awards honored the Top 10 Films of the year.

Top 10 Films
 Almost Famous
 Before Night Falls
 Best in Show
 Erin Brockovich
 Gladiator
 High Fidelity 
 Requiem for a Dream 
 Traffic
 Wonder Boys
 You Can Count on Me

2001
The 2001 AFI Awards honored the best in film and television of the year. The nominations were announced on December 17, 2001, and the ceremony was broadcast on January 5, 2002, on CBS. It did not do well in the ratings (getting only 5.5 million viewers), so it would not be held in this format again. The AFI would go back to just listing the Top 10 Films and Top 10 Television Programs of the year, and not have any technical nor acting categories.

Each winner is in bold with the other nominees after:

Movies

Movie of the Year
 The Lord of the Rings: The Fellowship of the Ring
 A Beautiful Mind
 Black Hawk Down
 In the Bedroom
 The Man Who Wasn't There
 Memento
 Monster's Ball
 Moulin Rouge!
 Mulholland Drive
 Shrek

Director of the Year
 Robert Altman – Gosford Park
 Todd Field – In the Bedroom
 David Lynch – Mulholland Drive
 Ridley Scott – Black Hawk Down

Actor of the Year – Male – Movies
 Denzel Washington as Alonzo Harris – Training Day
 Russell Crowe as John Forbes Nash Jr. – A Beautiful Mind
 Billy Bob Thornton as Ed Crane – The Man Who Wasn't There
 Tom Wilkinson as Matt Fowler – In the Bedroom

Actor of the Year – Female – Movies
 Sissy Spacek as Ruth Fowler – In the Bedroom
 Halle Berry as Leticia Musgrove – Monster's Ball
 Stockard Channing as Julie Styron – The Business of Strangers
 Naomi Watts as Betty Elms / Diane Selwyn – Mulholland Drive

Featured Actor of the Year – Male – Movies
 Gene Hackman as Royal Tenenbaum – The Royal Tenenbaums
 Steve Buscemi as Seymour – Ghost World
 Brian Cox as Big John Harrigan – L.I.E.
 Tony Shalhoub as Freddy Riedenschneider – The Man Who Wasn't There

Featured Actor of the Year – Female – Movies
 Jennifer Connelly as Alicia Nash – A Beautiful Mind
 Cate Blanchett as Kate Wheeler – Bandits
 Cameron Diaz as Julianna "Julie" Gianni – Vanilla Sky
 Frances O'Connor as Monica Swinton – A.I. Artificial Intelligence

Production Designer of the Year
 Grant Major – The Lord of the Rings: The Fellowship of the Ring
 Stephen Altman – Gosford Park
 Rick Carter – A.I. Artificial Intelligence
 Arthur Max – Black Hawk Down

Digital Effects Artist of the Year
 Jim Rygiel – The Lord of the Rings: The Fellowship of the Ring
 Nick Davis, Roger Guyett, and Robert Legato – Harry Potter and the Sorcerer's Stone
 Scott Farrar and Dennis Muren – A.I. Artificial Intelligence
 Bob Sabiston – Waking Life

Cinematographer of the Year
 Roger Deakins – The Man Who Wasn't There
 Ericson Core – The Fast and the Furious
 Sławomir Idziak – Black Hawk Down
 Janusz Kamiński – A.I. Artificial Intelligence

Screenwriter of the Year
 Christopher Nolan – Memento
 Daniel Clowes and Terry Zwigoff – Ghost World
 Robert Festinger and Todd Field – In the Bedroom
 Akiva Goldsman – A Beautiful Mind

Composer of the Year
 Craig Armstrong – Moulin Rouge!
 Angelo Badalamenti – Mulholland Drive
 Patrick Doyle – Gosford Park
 Howard Shore – The Lord of the Rings: The Fellowship of the Ring

Editor of the Year
 Jill Bilcock – Moulin Rouge!
 Dody Dorn – Memento
 Pietro Scalia – Black Hawk Down
 Tim Squyres – Gosford Park

Television

Drama Series of the Year
 The Sopranos (HBO) Buffy the Vampire Slayer (UPN)
 Six Feet Under (HBO)
 The West Wing (NBC)

Comedy Series of the Year
 Curb Your Enthusiasm (HBO) Everybody Loves Raymond (CBS)
 Malcolm in the Middle (Fox)
 Sex and the City (HBO)

Movie or Mini-Series of the Year
 Band of Brothers (HBO) Anne Frank: The Whole Story (ABC)
 Boycott (HBO)
 Conspiracy (HBO)

Actor of the Year – Male – TV Series
 James Gandolfini as Tony Soprano – The Sopranos
 Michael C. Hall as David Fisher – Six Feet Under
 Chi McBride as Principal Steven Harper – Boston Public
 Ray Romano as Raymond Barone – Everybody Loves Raymond

Actor of the Year – Female – TV Series
 Edie Falco as Carmela Soprano – The Sopranos
 Allison Janney as C. J. Cregg – The West Wing
 Jane Kaczmarek as Lois – Malcolm in the Middle
 Doris Roberts as Marie Barone – Everybody Loves Raymond

Actor of the Year – Male – TV Movie or Mini-Series
 Jeffrey Wright as Martin Luther King Jr. – Boycott
 Kenneth Branagh as Reinhard Heydrich – Conspiracy
 Ben Kingsley as Otto Frank – Anne Frank: The Whole Story
 Giovanni Ribisi as Mikal Gilmore – Shot in the Heart

Actor of the Year – Female – TV Movie or Mini-Series
 Judy Davis as Judy Garland – Life with Judy Garland: Me and My Shadows
 Tammy Blanchard as Young Judy Garland – Life with Judy Garland: Me and My Shadows
 Phylicia Rashad as Elizabeth – The Old Settler
 Hannah Taylor-Gordon as Anne Frank – Anne Frank: The Whole Story

2002
The 2002 AFI Awards honored the Top 10 Films and Top 10 Television Programs of the year.

Top 10 Films
 About a Boy
 About Schmidt
 Adaptation.
 Antwone Fisher
 Chicago
 Frida
 Gangs of New York
 The Hours
 The Lord of the Rings: The Two Towers
 The Quiet American

Top 10 Television Programs
 The Believer
 Boomtown
 Door to Door
 Everybody Loves Raymond
 The Gathering Storm
 Gilmore Girls
 The Simpsons
 Six Feet Under
 The Sopranos
 The West Wing

2003
The 2003 AFI Awards honored the Top 10 Films and Top 10 Television Programs of the year.

Top 10 Films
 American Splendor
 Finding Nemo
 The Human Stain
 In America
 The Last Samurai
 The Lord of the Rings: The Return of the King
 Lost in Translation
 Master and Commander: The Far Side of the World
 Monster
 Mystic River

Top 10 Television Programs
 24
 Alias
 Angels in America
 Arrested Development
 Everybody Loves Raymond
 Joan of Arcadia
 Nip/Tuck
 Playmakers
 Soldier's Girl
 The Wire

2004
The 2004 AFI Awards honored the Top 10 Films and Top 10 Television Programs of the year.

Top 10 Films
 The Aviator
 Collateral
 Eternal Sunshine of the Spotless Mind
 Friday Night Lights
 The Incredibles
 Kinsey
 Maria Full of Grace
 Million Dollar Baby
 Sideways
 Spider-Man 2

Top 10 Television Programs
 Arrested Development
 Curb Your Enthusiasm
 Deadwood
 Desperate Housewives
 Lost
 Nip/Tuck
 The Shield
 Something the Lord Made
 The Sopranos
 South Park

2005
The 2005 AFI Awards honored the Top 10 Films and Top 10 Television Programs of the year.

Top 10 Films
 The 40-Year-Old Virgin
 A History of Violence
 Brokeback Mountain
 Capote
 Crash
 Good Night, and Good Luck
 King Kong
 Munich
 The Squid and the Whale
 Syriana

Top 10 Television Programs
 24
 Battlestar Galactica
 Deadwood
 Grey's Anatomy
 House
 Lost
 Rescue Me
 Sleeper Cell
 Sometimes in April
 Veronica Mars

2006
The 2006 AFI Awards honored the Top 10 Films and Top 10 Television Programs of the year.

Top 10 Films
 Babel
 Borat: Cultural Learnings of America for Make Benefit Glorious Nation of Kazakhstan
 The Devil Wears Prada
 Dreamgirls
 Half Nelson
 Happy Feet
 Inside Man 
 Letters from Iwo Jima
 Little Miss Sunshine
 United 93

Top 10 Television Programs
 24
 Battlestar Galactica
 Dexter
 Elizabeth I
 Friday Night Lights
 Heroes
 The Office
 South Park
 The West Wing
 The Wire

Documentary
 Blindsight (Audience Award)

2007
The 2007 AFI Awards honored the Top 10 Films and Top 10 Television Programs of the year.

Top 10 Films
 Before the Devil Knows You're Dead
 The Diving Bell and the Butterfly
 Into the Wild
 Juno
 Knocked Up
 Michael Clayton
 No Country for Old Men
 Ratatouille
 The Savages
 There Will Be Blood

Top 10 Television Programs
 30 Rock
 Dexter
 Everybody Hates Chris
 Friday Night Lights
 Longford
 Mad Men
 Pushing Daisies
 The Sopranos
 Tell Me You Love Me
 Ugly Betty

Documentary
 Spine Tingler! The William Castle Story (Audience Award)

2008
The 2008 AFI Awards honored the Top 10 Films and Top 10 Television Programs of the year.

Top 10 Films
 The Curious Case of Benjamin Button
 The Dark Knight
 Frost/Nixon
 Frozen River
 Gran Torino
 Iron Man
 Milk
 WALL-E
 Wendy and Lucy
 The Wrestler

Top 10 Television Programs
 Breaking Bad
 In Treatment
 John Adams
 Life
 Lost
 Mad Men
 The Office
 Recount
 The Shield
 The Wire

2009
The 2009 AFI Awards honored the Top 10 Films and Top 10 Television Programs of the year.

Top 10 Films
 Coraline
 The Hangover
 The Hurt Locker
 The Messenger
 Precious: Based on the Novel 'Push' by Sapphire
 A Serious Man
 A Single Man
 Sugar
 Up
 Up in the Air

Top 10 Television Programs
 The Big Bang Theory
 Big Love
 Friday Night Lights
 Glee
 Mad Men
 Modern Family
 The No. 1 Ladies' Detective Agency
 Nurse Jackie
 Party Down
 True Blood

2010
The 2010 AFI Awards honored the Top 10 Films and Top 10 Television Programs of the year.

Top 10 Films
 127 Hours
 Black Swan
 The Fighter 
 Inception
 The Kids Are All Right
 The Social Network
 The Town
 Toy Story 3
 True Grit
 Winter's Bone

Top 10 Television Programs
 30 Rock
 The Big C
 Boardwalk Empire
 Breaking Bad
 Glee
 Mad Men
 Modern Family
 The Pacific
 Temple Grandin
 The Walking Dead

Special Awards
 The King's Speech
 Waiting for "Superman"

2011
The 2011 AFI Awards honored the Top 10 Films and Top 10 Television Programs of the year.

Top 10 Films
 Bridesmaids
 The Descendants
 The Girl with the Dragon Tattoo
 The Help
 Hugo
 J. Edgar
 Midnight in Paris
 Moneyball
 The Tree of Life
 War Horse

Top 10 Television Programs
 Boardwalk Empire
 Breaking Bad
 Curb Your Enthusiasm
 Game of Thrones
 The Good Wife
 Homeland
 Justified
 Louie
 Modern Family
 Parks and Recreation

Special Awards
 The Artist
 Harry Potter

2012
The 2012 AFI Awards honored the Top 10 Films and Top 10 Television Programs of the year.

Top 10 Films
 Argo
 Beasts of the Southern Wild
 The Dark Knight Rises
 Django Unchained
 Les Misérables
 Life of Pi
 Lincoln
 Moonrise Kingdom
 Silver Linings Playbook
 Zero Dark Thirty

Top 10 Television Programs
 American Horror Story: Asylum
 Breaking Bad
 Game Change
 Game of Thrones
 Girls
 Homeland
 Louie
 Mad Men
 Modern Family
 The Walking Dead

2013
The 2013 AFI Awards honored the Top 10 Films and Top 10 Television Programs of the year.

Top 10 Films
 12 Years a Slave
 American Hustle
 Captain Phillips
 Fruitvale Station
 Gravity
 Her
 Inside Llewyn Davis
 Nebraska
 Saving Mr. Banks
 The Wolf of Wall Street

Top 10 Television Programs
 The Americans
 Breaking Bad
 Game of Thrones
 The Good Wife
 House of Cards
 Mad Men
 Masters of Sex
 Orange Is the New Black
 Scandal
 Veep

2014
The 2014 AFI Awards honored the Top 11 Films and Top 10 Television Programs of the year.

Top 11 Films
 American Sniper
 Birdman or (The Unexpected Virtue of Ignorance)
 Boyhood
 Foxcatcher
 The Imitation Game
 Interstellar
 Into the Woods
 Nightcrawler
 Selma
 Unbroken
 Whiplash

Top 10 Television Programs
 The Americans
 Fargo
 Game of Thrones
 How to Get Away with Murder
 Jane the Virgin
 The Knick
 Mad Men
 Orange Is the New Black
 Silicon Valley
 Transparent

2015
The 2015 AFI Awards honored the Top 10 Films and Top 10 Television Programs of the year.

Top 10 Films
 The Big Short
 Bridge of Spies
 Carol
 Inside Out
 Mad Max: Fury Road
 The Martian
 Room
 Spotlight
 Star Wars: The Force Awakens
 Straight Outta Compton

Top 10 Television Programs
 The Americans
 Better Call Saul
 Black-ish
 Empire
 Fargo
 Game of Thrones
 Homeland
 Master of None
 Mr. Robot
 UnREAL

Special Award
The AFI Special Award was given to Mad Men, which for "its contributions to America's cultural legacy". The show has been listed in AFI's awards list seven times.

2016
The 2016 AFI Awards honored the Top 10 Films and Top 10 Television Programs of the year.

Top 10 Films
 Arrival
 Fences
 Hacksaw Ridge
 Hell or High Water
 La La Land
 Manchester by the Sea
 Moonlight
 Silence
 Sully
 Zootopia

Top 10 Television Programs
 The Americans
 Atlanta
 Better Call Saul
 The Crown
 Game of Thrones
 The Night Of
 The People v. O. J. Simpson: American Crime Story
 Stranger Things
 This Is Us
 Veep

Special Award
 O.J.: Made in America

2017
The 2017 AFI Awards honored the Top 10 Films and Top 10 Television Programs of the year.

Top 10 Films
 The Big Sick
 Call Me by Your Name
 Dunkirk
 The Florida Project
 Get Out
 Lady Bird
 The Post
 The Shape of Water
 Three Billboards Outside Ebbing, Missouri
 Wonder Woman

Top 10 Television Programs
 Big Little Lies
 The Crown
 Feud: Bette and Joan
 Game of Thrones
 The Good Place
 The Handmaid's Tale
 Insecure
 Master of None
 Stranger Things
 This Is Us

AFI Special Award
 The Vietnam War

2018
The 2018 AFI Awards honored the Top 10 Films and Top 10 Television Programs of the year.

Top 10 Films
 Black Panther
 BlacKkKlansman
 Eighth Grade
 The Favourite
 First Reformed
 Green Book
 If Beale Street Could Talk
 Mary Poppins Returns
 A Quiet Place
 A Star Is Born

Top 10 Television Programs
 The Americans
 The Assassination of Gianni Versace: American Crime Story
 Atlanta
 Barry
 Better Call Saul
 The Kominsky Method
 The Marvelous Mrs. Maisel
 Pose
 Succession
 This Is Us

AFI Special Award
 Roma

2019
The 2019 AFI Awards honored the Top 10 Films and Top 10 Television Programs of the year. The winners were announced on December 4, 2019, while the ceremony was held on January 3, 2020.

Top 10 Films
 1917
 The Farewell
 The Irishman
 Jojo Rabbit
 Joker
 Knives Out
 Little Women
 Marriage Story
 Once Upon a Time in Hollywood
 Richard Jewell

Top 10 Television Programs
 Chernobyl
 The Crown
 Fosse/Verdon
 Game of Thrones
 Pose
 Succession
 Unbelievable
 Veep
 Watchmen
 When They See Us

Game of Thrones earned its eighth mention, setting a new record. It also became the first and only continuing series to be awarded for all of its eligible seasons.

AFI Special Award
 Parasite
 Fleabag

2020
The 2020 AFI Awards were announced on January 25, 2021, and the selections were honored in a virtual event on February 26, 2021. The juries were led by Jeanine Basinger and Richard Frank.

Top 10 Films
Da 5 Bloods
Judas and the Black Messiah (a 2021 film)
Ma Rainey's Black Bottom
Mank
Minari
Nomadland
One Night in Miami...
Soul
Sound of Metal
The Trial of the Chicago 7

Top 10 Television Programs
Better Call Saul
Bridgerton
The Crown
The Good Lord Bird
Lovecraft Country
The Mandalorian
Mrs. America
The Queen's Gambit
Ted Lasso
Unorthodox

AFI Special Award
Hamilton

2021
The 2021 AFI Awards were announced on December 8, 2021. The ceremony was scheduled to be held on January 7, 2022, but was postponed to March 11, 2022, due to COVID-19.

Top 10 Films
CODA
Don't Look Up
Dune
King Richard
Licorice Pizza
Nightmare Alley
The Power of the Dog
Tick, Tick... Boom!
The Tragedy of Macbeth
West Side Story

Top 10 Television Programs
Hacks
Maid
Mare of Easttown
Reservation Dogs
Schmigadoon!
Succession
Ted Lasso
The Underground Railroad
WandaVision
The White Lotus

AFI Special Award
Belfast
Squid Game
Summer of Soul

2022
The 2022 AFI Awards were announced on December 9, 2022. The juries were led by Jeanine Basinger and Richard Frank.

Top 10 Films
Avatar: The Way of Water
Elvis
Everything Everywhere All at Once
The Fabelmans
Nope
She Said
Tár
Top Gun: Maverick
The Woman King
Women Talking

Top 10 Television Programs
Abbott Elementary
The Bear
Better Call Saul
Hacks
Mo
Pachinko
Reservation Dogs
Severance
Somebody Somewhere
The White Lotus

AFI Special Award
The Banshees of Inisherin

References

 
Awards established in 2000
2000 establishments in the United States